Sybra simalurica is a species of beetle in the family Cerambycidae. It was described by Breuning and de Jong in 1941. Larvae of this species drill into wood, which can cause damage to live wood or logs.

References

simalurica
Beetles described in 1941